Diadora is a genus of beetles in the family Buprestidae, containing the following species:

 Diadora lutea (Kerremans, 1897)
 Diadora undulata Obenberger, 1922
 Diadora willineri Cobos, 1972

References

Buprestidae genera